Mesopsocidae is a family of Psocodea (formerly Psocoptera) belonging to the suborder Psocomorpha. Members of the family are characterized by their free areola postica. The family includes more than 70 species.

References

Sources
Lienhard, C. & Smithers, C. N. 2002. Psocoptera (Insecta): World Catalogue and Bibliography. Instrumenta Biodiversitatis, vol. 5. Muséum d'histoire naturelle, Genève.

 
Psocoptera families